The International Journal of Geomechanics is a monthly peer-reviewed scientific journal published by the American Society of Civil Engineers that focuses on geomechanics, emphasizing theoretical aspects, to include computational and analytical methods, and related validations.

Abstracting and indexing
The journal is indexed in Ei Compendex, ProQuest databases, Civil Engineering Database, Inspec, Science Citation Index Expanded, and EBSCO databases.

References

External links

Engineering journals
American Society of Civil Engineers academic journals
Mining journals